Author! Author! is a 1982 American autobiographical film directed by Arthur Hiller, written by Israel Horovitz and starring Al Pacino.

Plot
Playwright Ivan Travalian has a Broadway play (English with Tears) in rehearsal and the backers want rewrites. His wife, Gloria, moves out, leaving him with custody of five children: four from her previous marriages and his son. His two stepdaughters and his stepson, Spike, return to their respective fathers, but two of the boys, his biological son Igor and his stepson Geraldo, accompany Ivan.

The stage producer lies to the investors, claiming that popular film actress Alice Detroit has signed on to play the lead on Broadway. Ivan meets with Alice, where she confesses that she is a big fan of his and would love to perform in his new play. They start dating and she eventually moves in with him and the remaining two children. One night, Ivan explains to her that he was an abandoned baby who was adopted by a family with the Armenian name "Travalian". Alice becomes depressed because she misses her former social life, so she and Ivan agree that their relationship has run its course and she moves out.

His two stepdaughters run away from their father's home to live with Ivan and the police come to retrieve them, but Ivan and the children stage a standoff on the roof of their building, convincing the police and their father to let the girls stay. Spike returns to the house with his father’s blessing, meaning all the children can stay with Ivan. Ivan decides that his wife should return as well so he takes a taxi to Gloucester, Massachusetts to retrieve her. He finds her painting on a snowy dock with her new boyfriend, where she resists his efforts to force her to return for the good of the children. Realizing her selfishness, Ivan leaves her in Gloucester, returns to New York City and promises his stepchildren they will always have a home with him. They attend the opening night of the play which receives a rave review in The New York Times.

Cast

 Al Pacino as Travalian
 Dyan Cannon as Alice Detroit
 Tuesday Weld as Gloria
 Alan King as Kreplich
 Bob Dishy as Finestein
 Bob Elliott as Patrick Dicker
 Ray Goulding as Jackie Dicker
 Eric Gurry as Igor
 Elva Leff as Bonnie
 B. J. Barie as Spike
 Ari Meyers as Debbie
 Benjamin H. Carlin as Geraldo
 Richard Belzer as Seth Shapiro

Elliott and Goulding, the longtime comedy duo of "Bob and Ray", were billed together in the opening credits. Reflecting the film's theme of family, producer Irwin Winkler's wife, actress Margo, and then-teenaged son, future UCLA School of Law professor Adam, along with the film's autobiographical screenwriter Israel Horovitz' children, future film producer Rachel and future television producer Matthew, make brief appearances.

Production
Horovitz first worked with Pacino in 1968, when Pacino starred in his play The Indian Wants the Bronx, for which they both received Obie Awards. They spent over the years and jumped at the chance to work again on the film.

The film was based on Horovitz's personal experience as a divorced father responsible for looking after two of his three children. "I felt there was a lot of room to explore the ease with which people get married in this country, the way kids come along in huge bunches and the irresponsibility of parents in taking care of those children." He also talked to his three children for inspiration. He said, "The film had to be written in a comic mode, because otherwise it's too painful to deal with."

Horovitz made the protagonist Armenian American to give him a strong ethnic identity parallel to his own Jewish background.

The film was released by 20th Century Fox and Hiller served as a director. He was drawn to the project because it was about an extended family and that it showed "that love is what makes a family strong, not necessarily who's the natural parent."

Casting
Cannon was originally asked to play Gloria, but turned it down because she found the character "bitchy" and had played that kind of role before. She was then asked to play Alice and agreed because she loved the character. Cannon enjoyed making the film and compared the experience to "being on a cruise". Alan King also enjoyed filming, and said that his character was a cross between Hal Prince and Zero Mostel.

Pacino did not get along with Hiller while filming. Pacino said, "sometimes people who are not really meant to be together get together in this business for a short time. It's very unfortunate for all parties concerned." Pacino told that he made the film, because he thought he would enjoy making a film "about a guy with his kids, dealing with New York and show business. I thought it would be fun." Pacino said that he enjoyed working with the actors, who spend time with his children.

Reception
In The Globe and Mail review, Jay Scott criticized the performances of the child actors: "The brood is composed of the most appalling set of exhibitionistic child actors this side of Eight Is Enough", and felt "that this comedy is not funny is bad enough; that it is resolutely and maliciously anti-female is unforgivable." Newsweek magazine's Jack Kroll wrote, "there's nothing sadder than a movie that tries to be adorable and isn't. Author! Author! tries so hard that the screen seems to sweat." In his review for  The Washington Post, Gary Arnold criticized Pacino's performance: "Pacino's maddening articulation would seem to argue against further flings at comedy. Line after line is obscured by his whispery mumble, and this mangled speech seems particularly inappropriate in a character who's supposed to be a playwright." Roger Ebert was also unimpressed, giving the film two stars and prompting him to ask "What's Pacino doing in this mess? What's happening to his career?" The film was nominated for a Razzie Awards for Worst Original Song for "Comin' Home to You". Critic Leonard Maltin, however, did give the film a warm review, awarding it 3 out of 4 stars, calling it a "slight but winning comedy", and Pacino was nominated for a Golden Globe Award for Best Actor – Motion Picture Musical or Comedy.

References

External links 
 
 
 

1982 films
1982 comedy films
1982 drama films
1980s romantic comedy-drama films
American romantic comedy-drama films
1980s English-language films
Films about theatre
Films about playwrights
Films about dysfunctional families
Films about families
Films set in New York City
Films shot in Massachusetts
Films shot in New York City
20th Century Fox films
Films scored by Dave Grusin
Films directed by Arthur Hiller
Films produced by Irwin Winkler
1980s American films